Franz Burri (1901–1987) was a Swiss political figure who, from his base in Germany, became the leading disseminater of Nazi propaganda in the country.

Born in Lucerne, to a half-German working-class family, Burri was a supporter of Nazi Germany from an early age and frequently visited the country during the 1930s. He came to full-time activism in 1941 by forming his own Bund der Schweizer in Grossdeutschland (League of the Swiss in Greater Germany), calling for a very close relationship between his country and Nazi Germany. Known for his crude language and his fondness for wearing the brown uniform of the Sturmabteilung, his hopes for a career in the SS were dashed when Reinhard Heydrich deemed him unsuitable. Also involved in the larger National Movement of Switzerland, Burri quit this organisation after the rejection of his SS application in 1941 to set up his own Nationalsozialistischer Schweizerbund (NSSB), although he moved to Germany full-time soon after this and ran a sister group, the Nationalsozialistische Bewegung in der Schweiz, from there. Both of the groups were funded directly by Germany.

Following his move to Germany Burri took up his role as the leading producer of Nazi propaganda for the Swiss market. From his base in Frankfurt, he produced the International Presseagentur, a newspaper funded by the Nazis. Within its pages Burri and his fellow writers, notably his closest ally and NSSB chief Ernst Leonhardt, called for a Union of the German Peoples in which Switzerland would be absorbed into the Third Reich in the same way that Austria had been. Having taken up German citizenship, he was symbolically stripped of his Swiss status in 1943.

After the war Burri was returned to Switzerland, where, in 1948, he was sentenced to 20 years imprisonment for speaking against the independence of the country. Burri was freed in 1959 and lived until 1987.

References

1901 births
1987 deaths
Nazi propagandists
Swiss Nazis
Prisoners and detainees of Switzerland
Swiss emigrants to Germany